The Abbot of Abingdon was the head (or abbot) of Anglo-Saxon and eventually Benedictine house of Abingdon Abbey at Abingdon-on-Thames in northern Berkshire (present-day Oxfordshire), England.

The following is a list of abbots of Abingdon:

Fictional abbots
Historian Susan E. Kelly regards the traditional first six abbots as fictional: "There is good reason to think that in most cases their names were simply plucked from early charters available in the abbey's archive, the majority of which would seem to have had no connection with an early minister at Abingdon; there is no very convincing evidence that the historians had access to independent, reliable sources of information. The 'history' of the pre-Æthelwoldian minister seems to a very large extent to represent a fictional reconstruction".

Probably fictional abbots:

Abbots

The historic abbots, right up to the dissolution of the abbey in 1538, are as follows:

Notes

References 

Lists of abbots
History of Oxfordshire
Abbot of Abingdon
Abbot of Abingdon